The Hillside Open was a golf tournament on the LPGA Tour from 1963 to 1964. It was played at the Montecito Country Club in Santa Barbara, California.

Winners
Hillside House Ladies' Open
1964 Ruth Jessen

Hillside Open
1963 Kathy Whitworth

References

Former LPGA Tour events
Golf in California
Sports in Santa Barbara, California
1963 establishments in California
1964 disestablishments in California
Women's sports in California